Grimus is an alternative rock band from Cluj-Napoca, Romania.

History 

While studying in Cluj-Napoca, the members started out as the 5-piece rock band Revers. In 2006, after having suffered multiple changes in the lineup, Grimus released a demo album. Their song Solitude is declared Song of the Year 2006 by City FM Radio. By 2007 the band received invitations to play at most music festivals in Romania. They take their name from Salman Rushdie's 1975 novel Grimus.

In October 2007, Grimus won the National Finals of the Global Battle of the Bands and represented Romania in the World Finals, releasing their debut album Panikon in 2008. The band then went on to work with British producer Adam Whittaker on the critically acclaimed follow-up "Egretta" for A&A Records and the subsequent "Emergence". The band's most recent release came in 2018.

Discography

Albums
 Panikon (2008)
 Egretta (2011)
 Emergence (2014)
 Unmanageable Species (2018)

Demos and singles
 Demo (2006)
 Umbre (2010)
 Started (2010)
 Face the Light (2011)
 In Your Eyes (2012)
 High (2013)
 The Hell I'm In (2014)
 Selfie (2014)
 Ultima Oara (2015)
 Vom Lupta (2016)
 Culoare (2016)

References

External links

 Grimus.ro - Official Website
 myspace.com/grimusworld - Grimus on Myspace
 last.fm/music/Grimus - Grimus on Last.FM
 GBOB.com - Global Battle of the Bands

Romanian alternative rock groups
Musical groups established in 2005